Mickey Charles Shuler Sr. (born August 21, 1956), is an American former professional football player who was a tight end in the National Football League (NFL) from 1978 to 1991. He played in 181 games over 14 seasons in the NFL for the New York Jets and the Philadelphia Eagles. He played college football at Penn State University from 1975 to 1977, where his son Mickey Shuler, Jr., also a tight end, played.

Early life
Shuler was born in Harrisburg, Pennsylvania.  He was a multi-sport star at East Pennsboro High School in Enola, Pennsylvania where he was also recruited by legendary college basketball coaches Dean Smith and Bobby Knight.

College career
At Penn State, Shuler was an All-American and a three-year letterman, playing in the Gator, Sugar, Fiesta, Hula and Japan Bowls.

He earned a Bachelor of Science in physical education at Penn State in 1979.

Professional career
A third-round pick (#61 overall) in 1978 NFL Draft by the New York Jets for whom he would play for 12 seasons. The 6' 3", 230-pound Shuler had seven playoff appearances and two Pro Bowl appearances (1986, 1988). He was named as the tight end for the Jets All Time Team and the Jets Dream Team.

For his career, Shuler totaled 462 receptions for 5,100 yards and 37 touchdowns. He is tied for third in all time receptions for the Jets. He is also second in most consecutive games with a reception (86 games) and second in most touchdowns in a game (three).

Personal life
Today, Shuler is very active in community service with many organizations, such as the New York Governor's Council on Drugs and Alcohol, the Pennsylvania Governor's Council on Physical Fitness, the Long Island chapter of the United Way, The Salvation Army, the Long Island and Pennsylvania chapters of the American Heart Association, Athletes Against Drugs and Alcohol, and Big Brothers Big Sisters of America,

He is currently the co-host of the Sports Channel weekly Jets TV Show and board member of CCNB Bank and is a member and inductee of the Pennsylvania Sports Hall of Fame. He lives in Enola, Pennsylvania with his wife, Susan.

Shuler's son, Mickey Shuler, Jr., was a starting tight end at Penn State and was drafted by the Minnesota Vikings in the seventh round of the 2010 NFL Draft, and played for the Miami Dolphins. He has also played for the Oakland Raiders, Buffalo Bills, Arizona Cardinals, Atlanta Falcons, and Jacksonville Jaguars.

References

1956 births
American Conference Pro Bowl players
American football tight ends
Players of American football from Harrisburg, Pennsylvania
Living people
New York Jets players
Penn State Nittany Lions football players
People from Cumberland County, Pennsylvania
Philadelphia Eagles players